Emily Bernard (born 1967) is an American writer and the Julian Lindsay Green and Gold Professor of English at the University of Vermont.

Early life and education
Emily Bernard was born in Nashville, Tennessee. She earned a BA and a PhD in American Studies from Yale University.

Awards and recognition
2001: New York Times Notable Book of the Year for Remember Me to Harlem: The Letters of Langston Hughes and Carl Van Vechten
2006: New York Public Library as a Book for the Teen Age for Some of My Best Friends: Writers on Interracial Friendship
2008–9: James Weldon Johnson Fellowship in African American Studies, Beinecke Rare Book and Manuscript Library
2010: NAACP Image Award for Outstanding Literary Work for Michelle Obama: The First Lady in Photographs
2019: Los Angeles Times – Christopher Isherwood Prize for Autobiographical Prose, for Black is the Body: Stories from My Grandmother’s Time, My Mother’s Time, and Mine

Selected works

Black is the Body: Stories from My Grandmother’s Time, My Mother’s Time, and Mine (2019), Knopf
Carl Van Vechten and the Harlem Renaissance: A Portrait in Black and White (2010), Yale University Press
Michelle Obama: The First Lady in Photographs with Deborah Willis (2009), W.W. Norton
Some of My Best Friends: Writings on Interracial Friendships (2004), HarperCollins
Remember Me to Harlem: The Letters of Langston Hughes and Carl Van Vechten (2001), Knopf

References

External links
Official website: Emily Bernard

Living people
21st-century American women writers
Yale College alumni
University of Vermont faculty
American women academics
Writers from Nashville, Tennessee
Year of birth missing (living people)
21st-century American non-fiction writers
Yale Graduate School of Arts and Sciences alumni
American women non-fiction writers
21st-century American academics